Donald "Don" Emil Ganem (born September 23, 1950) is an American physician, virologist, professor emeritus of microbiology and medicine, and former global head of infectious disease research at Novartis Institutes for BioMedical Research (NIBR).

Biography
Ganem graduated in 1968 from Phillips Academy Andover and in 1972 from Harvard College. After two years of medical school, he took an 18-month leave of absence to work on SV40 DNA replication with George Fareed. In 1977 Ganem graduated with an M.D. from Harvard Medical School. At Peter Bent Brigham Hospital (now Brigham and Women's Hospital) he was a resident and chief resident in internal medicine. At the University of California, San Francisco (UCSF) he did subspecialty training in infectious diseases, working in Harold Varmus's laboratory. At UCSF he became a faculty member in 1982 and eventually Professor of Microbiology & Immunology and Medicine. In 1991 he also became an investigator of the Howard Hughes Medical Institute.

At UCSF Ganem was part of a team, including David Wang and Joseph L. DeRisi, that developed a highly parallel viral screening system using DNA microarrays to detect and genotype viral pathogens. Ganem and co-workers also elucidated the functional significance of SV40-encoded microRNAs in viral infection. With Joseph L. DeRisi and six other researchers, Ganem found four novel viruses that infect honey bees.

Ganem practices internal medicine in San Francisco.

On May 20, 1985, in Alameda County he married Peggy S. Weintrub, a pediatrician. They have two daughters, Alison Marjorie (born 1989) and Natalie Katherine (born 1990). Both daughters are lawyers.

Awards and honors
 2003 — Member of the Institute of Medicine (now renamed the National Academy of Medicine)
 2004 — Fellow of the American Academy of Arts and Sciences
 2006–2007 — President of the American Society for Virology
 2010 — Member of the National Academy of Sciences
 2016 — UCSF Medal

References

External links
 (online links to many of Ganem's publications)
 Don Ganem (Novartis Institutes for Biomedical Research) 4 Part Lecture, 2010, iBiology

American virologists
American immunologists
20th-century American physicians
21st-century American physicians
Phillips Academy alumni
Harvard College alumni
Harvard Medical School alumni
Members of the National Academy of Medicine
Members of the United States National Academy of Sciences
Fellows of the American Academy of Arts and Sciences
Howard Hughes Medical Investigators
UCSF School of Medicine faculty
Novartis people
American people of Lebanese descent
1950 births
Living people